Charles Ian Orr-Ewing, Baron Orr-Ewing, OBE (10 February 1912 – 19 August 1999) was a British Conservative politician.

Early life
Orr-Ewing was a great-grandson of Sir Archibald Orr-Ewing, Bt. He was educated at Harrow School and Trinity College, Oxford. At Trinity College he qualified as an electrical engineer, with an MA in physics. Then, as a 22-year-old graduate apprentice at EMI in 1934, he was part of a team of three which built the first production television set.

Career
Orr-Ewing worked with the BBC from 1937 until 1939, when he joined the Royal Air Force Volunteer Reserve and served in the North Africa, Italy and North-West Europe theatres during World War II and was also General Eisenhower's Chief Radar Officer in 1945. He was appointed an Officer of the Order of the British Empire (OBE) in 1945. After the war, he returned to the BBC until 1949.

Orr-Ewing's political career began in 1950, when he was elected Member of Parliament for Hendon North, a seat he held for five elections. During this time, he was: Parliamentary Private Secretary to Walter Monckton, the Minister of Labour, from 1951 to 1955; Parliamentary Under-Secretary to George Reginald Ward, the Secretary of State for Air, from 1957 to 1959; Parliamentary and Financial Secretary to the Admiralty in 1959; Civil Lord of the Admiralty from 1959 to 1963; Vice-President of the Parliamentary and Scientific Committee in 1966 and Vice-Chairman of the Defence Committee from 1966 to 1970.

Between 1951 and 1954, he served on the Council of the Royal Television Society.

Having been created a baronet in 1963, Orr-Ewing retired from the House of Commons in 1970 and was created a life peer on 30 April 1971, as Baron Orr-Ewing, of Little Berkhamsted in the County of Hertfordshire.

Personal life
Orr-Ewing was an amateur radio enthusiast, holding the call sign G5OG until his death. The format of his call sign indicates that his licence was issued between 1921 and 1939. In November 1976 during the opening of Parliament, prior to his announcement of Presidency of the Radio Society of Great Britain, George Wallace, Baron Wallace of Coslany quipped that Orr-Ewing held an amateur licence and that he was colloquially known as "George Five Old Girl", a play on his call sign using non-standard phonetic alphabet. Orr-Ewing died on 19 August 1999.

References

External links
 

1912 births
1999 deaths
Alumni of Trinity College, Oxford
Orr-Ewing, Ian, 1st Baronet
Conservative Party (UK) MPs for English constituencies
Orr-Ewing, Ian Orr-Ewing, Baron
Lords of the Admiralty
Officers of the Order of the British Empire
People educated at Harrow School
Royal Air Force officers
Royal Air Force Volunteer Reserve personnel of World War II
UK MPs 1950–1951
UK MPs 1951–1955
UK MPs 1955–1959
UK MPs 1959–1964
UK MPs 1964–1966
UK MPs 1966–1970
UK MPs who were granted peerages
People from Little Berkhamsted
European amateur radio operators
Ministers in the Macmillan and Douglas-Home governments, 1957–1964
Life peers created by Elizabeth II